These are the international rankings of Bulgaria

Geographic rankings 

14th largest country in Europe

Demographic rankings

Economic rankings

Political rankings 

 1Note: lower ranking at the FSI means more sustainable, and higher means more unstable.

Military rankings

References

Bulgaria